Rupasinghe A. Wimalasena Perera (born 30 May 1945) is a Sri Lankan former long-distance runner. He competed in the marathon at the 1968 Summer Olympics.

References

External links
 

1945 births
Living people
Athletes (track and field) at the 1968 Summer Olympics
Sri Lankan male long-distance runners
Sri Lankan male marathon runners
Olympic athletes of Sri Lanka
Athletes (track and field) at the 1966 British Empire and Commonwealth Games
Commonwealth Games competitors for Sri Lanka
Sportspeople from Colombo
20th-century Sri Lankan people
21st-century Sri Lankan people